Leon Terence Anthony Cort (born 11 September 1979) is a former footballer who played as a defender. He is the younger brother of Carl Cort and the older half-brother of Ruben Loftus-Cheek.

Cort began his career as at non-league side Dulwich Hamlet before turning professional with Millwall in 1998. He was unable to break into the first team at the New Den and after loan spells with Forest Green Rovers and Stevenage Borough he left for Southend United. His career took off at Roots Hall and in 2004 he earned a move to Hull City. He helped the Tigers gain promotion to the Championship in 2004–05.

He joined Crystal Palace in the summer of 2006 before joining Stoke City in October 2007 in a swap deal with Clint Hill. Cort formed a strong defensive partnership with Ryan Shawcross at the Britannia Stadium as Stoke gained promotion to the Premier League. Cort was unable to hold on to his place in the top flight and joined Burnley in January 2010 for a fee of £1.5 million. He then had a short loan spell with Preston North End before ending his career at Charlton Athletic.

Born in England, he represented Guyana at international level.

Club career

Southend United
Born in Bermondsey, London, Cort began his career at local non-League side Dulwich Hamlet. He was invited by Mick Beard to trial at Millwall before signing pro-forms with his local league club Millwall in 1998. His career at The New Den never really took off, and after a loan spell at Forest Green Rovers and Stevenage Borough he joined Southend United on a free transfer. While at Southend Cort earned rave reviews and was tipped for greater things. He became a regular in the side, achieving a remarkable feat of appearing in 130 consecutive league matches without missing any through injury or suspension.

Hull City
In May 2004, Cort was offered a new contract at Southend United but soon, Hull City manager Peter Taylor said he would be interested in signing Cort. Cort moved to newly promoted Hull City in the summer of 2004, again on a free transfer. Hull were promoted again that season, to The Championship, and in this division Cort excelled himself as Hull survived comfortably. At the end of the season, Cort signed a two-year extensions. In a game between Hull and Carl's team at the time Wolverhampton Wanderers in 2006, Leon scored for Hull and Carl scored for Wolves.

Crystal Palace
At the end of that season manager Peter Taylor departed to Crystal Palace and made Cort his first signing for £1.25m, and gave him a return to his native South London. He again impressed and became popular with the Palace fans, winning the Player of the Year Award in 2007. The following season started poorly for the Eagles and saw Taylor sacked and replaced by Neil Warnock, and Cort soon departed on loan to Stoke City.

Stoke City
Cort's last game for Palace was at Selhurst Park against Stoke. Cort's career at the Britannia Stadium began very well, with assured performances featuring a remarkable tally of eight goals in just six months from the defender helping the Potters gain promotion to the Premier League. However the next season, Cort find himself further down the pecking order as Ryan Shawcross and Abdoulaye Faye was preferred to be used in central defence.

Burnley
Cort signed for Premier League side Burnley on 27 January 2010 for £1.5 million signing a three-and-a-half-year deal. After appearing on the bench without being used for Burnley, Cort finally made his debut in a 1–1 draw against his former club Stoke City where he made his first start in the Premier League since 2008 when Cort at his former club Stoke. On 6 March 2010, Cort provided his first assist in the Premier League for David Nugent in a 3–1 loss against Arsenal. Following Burnley relegation to Championship after losing 4–0 to Liverpool, Cort believes the Clarets to climb back into the Premier League at the first time of asking.

However, after the Clarets were relegated, he found opportunities limited after reduced of playing time and on 25 November 2010, Cort joined Preston North End on a monthlong loan. On 27 November 2010, Cort made his debut in a 0–0 draw against Millwall. On 1 January 2011, Cort loan spell at Preston has extended until 23 January.

Charlton Athletic
On 29 August 2011, Cort was once again sent out on loan, this time to Charlton Athletic. Cort made his debut for the club in a 3–2 win over Rochdale on 17 September 2011 as a substitute in the late minute. While at loan at Charlton, Cort made six appearances and didn't get more playing time so he was on the bench without been used due to good central defence performance from Michael Morrison and Matt Taylor. Cort was released by Burnley on 9 January 2012 after not making appearance for the club that season. On 12 January 2012, Cort signed a permanent deal with Charlton. From late March to nearly end of April, Cort able to get more playing time and led the club promoted to the Championship. On 18 August 2012, Cort scored his first league goal for The Addicks, on the opening day of the Championship season, in the 1–1 draw with Birmingham City. On 16 May 2013, Cort signed a one-year contract extension. On 22 May 2014, he was released from Charlton Athletic.

Following his release from Charlton, Cort began training with his former club Southend United but announced his retirement in July 2014.

International career
In October 2011, Cort was called up to Guyana for their 2014 FIFA World Cup qualifiers against Barbados and Bermuda. He scored his only international goal on 11 November 2011 in a World Cup qualifier in a 2–1 win against Trinidad and Tobago.

Career statistics

Club
Source:

International
Source:

Honours
 Hull City
 Football League One runner-up: 2004–05

 Stoke City
 Football League Championship runner-up: 2007–08

Charlton Athletic
Football League One champions: 2011–12

References

External links
 Leon Cort player profile at cafc.co.uk
 
 

1979 births
Living people
Footballers from Bermondsey
English footballers
English people of Guyanese descent
Guyanese footballers
Guyana international footballers
Association football defenders
Dulwich Hamlet F.C. players
Millwall F.C. players
Forest Green Rovers F.C. players
Stevenage F.C. players
Southend United F.C. players
Hull City A.F.C. players
Crystal Palace F.C. players
Stoke City F.C. players
Burnley F.C. players
Preston North End F.C. players
Charlton Athletic F.C. players
Premier League players
English Football League players
National League (English football) players
Bolton Wanderers F.C. non-playing staff